The 2017 Viterra Saskatchewan Scotties Tournament of Hearts, the provincial women's curling championship of Saskatchewan was held from January 24–29 at the Horizon Credit Union Centre in Melvile. The winning Penny Barker team represented Saskatchewan at the 2017 Scotties Tournament of Hearts in St. Catharines, Ontario.

Moose Jaw's Penny Barker won her first provincial women's title, sealing the victory after a hit for four points in the final, defeating North Battleford's Robyn Silvernagle. The Barker rink was ranked 7th going into the tournament, and only made the playoffs after winning a tiebreaker match. She then won three straight playoff games to claim the title. The 2017 Scotties Tournament of Hearts will be the first national championship for all four members of the Barker rink. The team is the first Moose Jaw-based team to win the provincial title since 1999.

Dayna Demers, third for the Silvernagle rink won the Marj Mitchell Award for sportsmanship and competitiveness.

Teams
Notably absent from the 2017 Saskatchewan Scotties is the defending champion Jolene Campbell rink. She failed to qualify for provincials after a 1-3 record at the "last chance" event. The top seed in the event was the Chantelle Eberle rink, who was ranked 38th on the World Curling Tour money list. The top Saskatchewan team on the WCT money list was 4-time provincial champion Sherry Anderson who got the second seed. The event also included 4-time provincial champion Stefanie Lawton.

The teams are listed as follows:

Round-robin standings

Scores
Draw 1
Silvernagle 7-6 Anderson
Eberle 8-5 Selzer
Lawton 9-5 Martin
Barber 7-6 Schneider

Draw 2
Selzer 10-5 Martin
Lawton 10-7 Barber
Barker 9-8 Anderson
Silvernagle 6-4 Eberle

Draw 3
Lawton 8-6 Barker
Silvernagle 6-5 Schneider
Barber 4-3 Selzer
Martin 8-7 Anderson

Draw 4
Silvernagle 9-1 Barber
Martin 6-4 Barker
Eberle 10-3 Schneider
Selzer 5-4 Lawton

Draw 5
Barker 9-3 Selzer
Lawton 8-4 Schneider
Barber 12-4 Anderson
Martin 6-5 Eberle

Draw 6
Lawton 8-3 Eberle
Anderson 9-5 Selzer
Martin 5-3 Silvernagle
Schneider 8-7 Barker

Draw 7
Anderson 8-3 Schneider
Barber 7-6 Martin
Barker 7-4 Eberle
Silvernagle 7-6 Selzer

Draw 8
Eberle 11-4 Barber
Silvernagle 6-5 Barker
Selzer 11-6 Schneider
Lawton 10-7 Anderson

Draw 9
Martin 9-5 Schneider
Anderson 10-4 Eberle
Silvernagle 8-2 Lawton
Barker 8-6 Barber

Tiebreaker
Barker 9-3 Barber

Playoffs

1 vs. 2
Saturday, January 28, 8:00pm

3 vs. 4
Saturday, January 28, 8:00pm

Semifinal
Sunday, January 29, 1:00pm

Final
Sunday, January 29, 6:00pm

References

Saskatchewan
Curling in Saskatchewan
2017 in Saskatchewan
January 2017 sports events in Canada